Chinaman Island is an uninhabited island located in Western Port, Victoria, south-eastern Australia.  It lies about 4 km north of French Island. It is considered to be of State botanical and zoological significance.  It is accessible at low tide by fording a small tidal creek in Warneet.

External links
Parks Victoria - Yaringa Marine National Park

Islands of Victoria (Australia)
Western Port
Uninhabited islands of Australia